Biyani is a surname. Notable people carrying the name include:

Brijlal Biyani (1896–1968), Indian independence activist and writer
Gagan Biyani (born 1987), Indian American entrepreneur, marketer and journalist
Kishore Biyani, Indian businessman

See also
Biyani Group of Colleges
Biyani Institute of Science and Management for Girls
Biyani International Institute of Engineering & Technology
Biyani Family, a fictional family in the Indian TV series Badii Devrani
Biryani